1999 World Championships may refer to:

 Alpine skiing: Alpine World Ski Championships 1999
 Athletics:
 1999 World Championships in Athletics
 1999 IAAF World Indoor Championships
Cross-country running: 1999 IAAF World Cross Country Championships
Road running: 1999 IAAF World Half Marathon Championships
 Badminton: 1999 IBF World Championships
 Bandy: 1999 Bandy World Championship
 Biathlon: Biathlon World Championships 1999
 Boxing: 1999 World Amateur Boxing Championships
 Chess: FIDE World Chess Championship 1999
 Curling:
 1999 World Men's Curling Championship
 1999 World Women's Curling Championship
 Cycling: 1999 UCI Road World Championships
 Darts:
 1999 BDO World Darts Championship
 1999 PDC World Darts Championship
 Figure skating: 1999 World Figure Skating Championships
 Ice hockey: 1999 Men's World Ice Hockey Championships
 Ice hockey: 1999 IIHF Women's World Championship
 Nordic skiing: FIS Nordic World Ski Championships 1999
 Rowing: 1999 World Rowing Championships
 Speed skating:
Allround: 1999 World Allround Speed Skating Championships
Sprint: 1999 World Sprint Speed Skating Championships
Single distances: 1999 World Single Distance Speed Skating Championships

See also
 1999 World Cup (disambiguation)
 1999 Continental Championships
 1999 World Junior Championships